Clare of Montefalco (c. 1268 – August 18, 1308), also called Saint Clare of the Cross, was an Augustinian nun and abbess. Before becoming a nun, Clare was a member of the Third Order of St. Francis (Secular). She was canonized by Pope Leo XIII on December 8, 1881. She differs from Clare of Assisi  (1194 – 1253), a contemporary of St Francis and the founder of an order of Poor Clares.

Life
Clare was born in Montefalco, in Umbria, likely in the year 1268. She was born into a well-to-do family, the daughter of Damiano and Iacopa Vengente. Her father, Damiano, had built a hermitage within the town of Montefalco. Clare's older sister Joan (Giovanna in Italian) and her friend Andreola lived as Franciscan tertiaries in that hermitage as part of the Secular Third Order of St. Francis. In 1274, when Clare was six years of age, the Bishop of Spoleto permitted Joan to receive more sisters, and it was at this time that Clare joined the Third Order of St. Francis (Secular), moving into the hermitage and adopting the Franciscan habit. In 1278, the community had grown sufficiently large that they had to build a larger hermitage farther from town.

In 1290, Clare, her sister Joan, and their companions sought to enter the monastic life in a more strict sense, and they made application to the Bishop of Spoleto. As the Third Order of St. Francis (Regular) was not yet established, the bishop established their monastery adjacent to the church of Sant'Illuminata in Montefalco according to the Rule of St. Augustine. Clare made her vows of poverty, chastity, and obedience and became an Augustinian nun. Her sister Joan was elected as the first abbess, and their small hermitage (built and funded by their father) was dedicated as a monastery. On November 22, 1291, Joan died, after which Clare was elected abbess. She was initially reluctant to accept her position, but did so after the intervention of the Bishop of Spoleto.

1294 was a decisive year in Clare's spiritual life. During the celebration of the Epiphany, after making a general confession in front of all her fellow nuns, she fell into ecstasy and remained in that state for several weeks. Since she was unable even to eat during this period, the other nuns sustained Clare's life by feeding her sugar water. During this time, Clare reported having a vision in which she saw herself being judged in front of God.

Clare also reported having a vision of Jesus dressed as a poor traveller. She described his countenance as being overwhelmed by the weight of the cross and his body as showing signs of fatigue. During the vision, Clare knelt in front of him, and whilst trying to stop him she asked, "My Lord, where art Thou going?" Jesus answered her: "I have looked all over the world for a strong place where to plant this Cross firmly, and I have not found any". After she reached for the cross, making known her desire to help him carry it, He said to her: "Clare, I have found a place for My cross here. I have finally found someone to whom I can trust Mine cross," and he implanted it in her heart. Clare took her belief in this vision seriously. The rest of her years were spent in pain and suffering, yet she continued to joyfully serve as abbess, teacher, mother and spiritual directress of her nuns. While Clare's reputation for holiness and wisdom attracted visitors to the Monastery of the Holy Cross, she proved to be worldly-wise and canny in the way she governed her monastery. She was careful not to disrupt the communal harmony and the necessary day-to-day management of the monastery's domestic affairs.

In 1303, Clare was able to build a church in Montefalco which would not only serve as a chapel for the nuns, but also as a church for the town. The first stone was blessed by the Bishop of Spoleto on June 24, and that day the church was dedicated to the Holy Cross (Santa Croce); the remnant portion of that small church comprises the frescoed Chapel of Santa Croce connected to the larger Santa Chiara in Montefalco.

Clare had served as abbess for sixteen years. By August 1308, she had become so ill that she was bedridden. On August 15, she asked to receive Extreme Unction, and on the next day she sent for her brother to come to the monastery. Clare made her last confession on August 17, and died at about 40 years of age in the convent on August 18.

Post Death Controversy

Immediately following Clare's death her heart was removed from her body, and upon inspection it was reported that symbols of Christ's passion, a crucifix and a scourge, were found within her heart. Other historians report that an "autopsy" was conducted and a small crucifix was found in her heart and three gallstones were found in her gallbladder, which were taken as a symbol of the Holy Trinity. Upon hearing the news of these signs, the vicar of the Bishop of Spoleto traveled to Montefalco "burning with indignation" suspecting that the nuns of the convent had planted the symbols. A commission consisting of physicians, jurists, and theologians was assembled to conduct an investigation, which subsequently "ruled out the possibility of fabrication or artifice". The vicar of the Bishop of Spoleto, who came to Montefalco as an inquisitor eager to punish those responsible for fraud, came to be convinced of the authenticity of the findings after personally verifying that the signs were not the result of trickery. However, doubts as to the veracity of the findings persisted even at the canonization proceedings, which were fraught with conflicts including a challenge from the Franciscans that Clare should not be canonized as a saint of the Order of Saint Augustine because she had been a Franciscan tertiary. During the proceedings Tommaso Boni, a Franciscan from Foligno and formerly chaplain to Clare's community, stated that he suspected that the "symbols in her heart were planted by a nun from Foligno"; furthermore that John Pulicinus, who had been chaplain at the time of Clare's death, had opposed the veneration of the symbols found in her heart.

The crucifix reportedly found within Clare's heart is about the size of a thumb. Christ's head leans slightly towards the right arm of the crucifix, and his body is white, except for the "tiny aperture in the right side which is a livid reddish color." The scourge and crown of thorns are apparently formed by whitish nerve fibers, and the three nails are formed of a dark fibrous tissue.

The body of Clare is now reduced to bones. A statue of her body is on display to pilgrims in the crypt of the Basilica of St Clare in Montefalco in a glass sarcophagus; the bones are on display in the rear of the sarcophagus but can only be seen by nuns who have access to the rear of the crypt. Her heart is displayed for veneration at the same church.

Canonization
The canonization process was initiated in 1328, but it was not until April 13, 1737, that Clare was beatified by Pope Clement XII. On December 8, 1881, the feast of the Immaculate Conception, Pope Leo XIII canonized Clare as Saint Clare of Montefalco at Saint Peter's Basilica in Rome. She was recognized as an Augustinian rather than a Franciscan.

See also

Incorruptibility
List of Catholic saints

References

External links

 Clare of Montefalco at Order of Saint Augustine
 Life of Clare of Montefalco (Augustinians of the Midwest)

1268 births
1308 deaths
People from the Province of Perugia
Augustinian saints
Augustinian nuns
Franciscan nuns
Pope Leo XIII
14th-century Italian Roman Catholic religious sisters and nuns
Italian Roman Catholic abbesses
14th-century Christian saints
Italian Roman Catholic saints
Incorrupt saints
Christian female saints of the Middle Ages
Canonizations by Pope Leo XIII
Beatifications by Pope Clement XII